Wagatha Christie is a popular name given to a dispute between Rebekah Vardy and Coleen Rooney, which culminated in a 2022 libel case in the English High Court titled Vardy v Rooney. The dispute began in 2019, when Rooney accused Vardy of leaking posts from her private Instagram account to the British newspaper The Sun. In 2020 Vardy sued Rooney for libel and the case came to trial in London in May 2022. On 29 July 2022, the court dismissed Vardy's claim on the basis that Rooney's statements were substantially true. Vardy was ordered to pay a substantial proportion of Rooney's legal expenses which, together with her own legal costs, have been estimated to total £3m.

The dispute and trial attracted significant media attention, in part because Vardy and Rooney are "WAGs", an acronym applied by the British media to wives of prominent British footballers. The case aquired its popular name, a portmanteau of WAG and the name of the whodunnit fiction writer Agatha Christie, because of the steps taken by Rooney to investigate the source of the leaks.

Dispute
In 2019, Coleen Rooney, the wife of the footballer Wayne Rooney, suspected that posts from her private Instagram account were being leaked to The Sun, a British tabloid newspaper that regularly publishes celebrity stories. To determine the source of the stories, Rooney posted fabricated stories and restricted access to them to Rebekah Vardy, the wife of footballer Jamie Vardy. The Sun published these stories, which included claims that the basement of Rooney's house had flooded, that Rooney had visited Mexico to "make a baby girl", and that Rooney had planned to appear on Strictly Come Dancing.

In late 2019, Rooney posted on Twitter that Vardy had leaked the stories to the press. Rooney's tweet went viral and was dubbed "Wagatha Christie", a portmanteau of the term "WAG"– an acronym for the wives and girlfriends of professional athletes– and the name of Agatha Christie, a well-known writer of whodunit crime fiction. Vardy responded on Twitter, denying the claims and implying her Instagram account had been hacked.

Libel trial

In June 2020, Vardy commenced action in the English High Court to sue Rooney for defamation. Defamation and libel cases are often not brought to the High Court; lawyers often advise against taking such cases to court because the reputational loss for the complainant is often high. At a preliminary High Court hearing on 19 November 2020, Justice Warby found Rooney had used defamatory words about Vardy. Neither Rooney nor Vardy were at the court.

Vardy argued that the accusation over her Instagram account was false. Following the earlier ruling, it was Rooney's onus to prove Vardy was responsible for leaking stories to The Sun or to convince the judge that publication of the allegation was in the public interest. Rooney testified that she offered several out of court settlements.

The trial commenced on 10 May 2022. During the proceedings, Rooney requested documents related to The Sun publisher News Group Newspapers and four The Sun journalists. The judge Justice Steyn allowed Vardy to use written summaries from these journalists as part of the case.

The judge also asked for the mobile phones of Vardy and her agent Caroline Watt to be searched. Watt said she had accidentally dropped her phone into the North Sea during a family holiday in Scotland. Vardy's copy of the messages were said to have been lost during a failed backup when Vardy's technology expert "[forgot] the password which he used to encrypt the material". Rooney's lawyer David Sherborne said  these were attempts to conceal incriminating evidence. Rooney's lawyers also cited the Armory v Delamirie case of 1722, which set a precedent stating that any deliberately missing evidence in a case should be assumed to be of the highest possible value, arguing that this also applies to electronic communications. 

Rooney alleged Vardy was the source of information for The Sun on Sunday "Secret Wag" feature, an anonymous column that discussed the private lives of others. Sherbourne questioned Vardy about her history of leaking information to the tabloid press, quoting from a 2004 interview in which Vardy detailed a sexual encounter with singer Peter Andre. Vardy apologised, saying her former husband had forced her to participate in the interview and that her words had been misrepresented. 

The trial received international media coverage and ended on 19 May. Helen Lewis, a writer for the American magazine The Atlantic, called the case "the most ill-advised defamation case" since Oscar Wilde's dispute with the Marquess of Queensberry. Lewis wrote that the trial represented "a clash between different ideas of celebrity", with Rooney guarding her privacy and Vardy "an avatar of a made-for-Instagram world, in which you are a fool if you do not monetise your personal life".

Judgment
On 29 July, Justice Steyn ruled in favour of Rooney. Steyn said that Vardy had regularly passed information about Rooney to the press, was critical of missing evidence from Vardy and called her evidence "manifestly inconsistent with the contemporaneous documentary evidence, evasive or implausible" on "many occasions". Steyn also said The Sun on Sunday "Secret Wag" column "is highly likely... [to have been] a journalistic construct rather than a person", and that "the evidence connecting Ms Vardy to this column is thin".

Vardy faced estimated legal costs of approximately £3million and her reputation was damaged. She said that she was "extremely sad and disappointed at the decision" and that she had been the subject of "vile abuse" since the trial began. She told Kate McCann of TalkTV that the media coverage of the case had been sexist and misogynistic, and she was later said to be experiencing panic attacks and post-traumatic stress as a result of the trial.

In her press statement, Rooney said that she was pleased but did not believe the case should have gone to court when the money could have been better spent elsewhere. Rooney also said that she was not seeking any compensation for the case.

At a subsequent hearing, Justice Steyn ordered Vardy to pay 90% of Rooney's costs with the first installment assessed at £800,000 to be paid by mid-November 2022.  The full amount is expected to be approximately £1,500,000.  Vardy's own legal costs were estimated to have been a similar figure, resulting in the total cost for Vardy of the litigation she commenced but lost being potentially around £3m.

In popular culture 
The trial has been dramatised with adaptations both on television and on the stage. Channel 4 broadcast its dramatisation, Vardy v Rooney: A Courtroom Drama, in December 2022. Vardy v Rooney: The Wagatha Christie Trial, a verbatim dramatisation of the trial, was staged at Wyndham's Theatre in London's West End between November 2022 and January 2023. Lucy May Barker and Laura Dos Santos played Vardy and Rooney respectively.

See also 
 Canary trap
 English defamation law
 Trial by media

References 

High Court of Justice cases
2022 in British law
English defamation case law
Rooney family (England)